Reedy Creek Observatory (obs. code: 428) is an astronomical observatory the location for observations of near-Earth objects by John Broughton, an Australian amateur astronomer.

See also 
 Asteroid 24105 Broughton
 List of astronomical observatories

References

External links 
  
 Dome of the Reedy Creek Observatory, image
 Announcement of P/2005 T5
 Mention of the Shoemaker Grant, and Broughton's discovery of 2004 GA1

Astronomical observatories in Queensland
Buildings and structures on the Gold Coast, Queensland